Crusaders of Khazan is a computer adaptation of the tabletop role-playing game Tunnels and Trolls, developed and published by New World Computing in 1990 for DOS, FM Towns, PC-88 and PC-98. The game is available from Flying Buffalo and in Fiery Dragon's Tunnels and Trolls 30th Anniversary Edition. The game was an international production, designed and directed in the US but programmed in Japan.

Story
A long time ago, a war broke out in the Dragon Continent between the great wizard Khazan and the demon queen Lerotra'hh the Death Empress and her sorcerer consort Khara Kang. Wishing to stop the bloodshed, Khazan proposed a truce to Lerotra'hh: Khazan would go into exile in exchange for a promise that the evil pair would allow humankind and monsterkind to coexist peacefully. Lerotra'hh accepted the proposal and Khazan was never heard from again. As the game begins, however, Lerotra'hh has broken the pact and now she prepares her Dark Legions to attack. The player's quest is put this threat to an end (meaning killing Kang and then Lerotra'hh) and to bring Khazan back to this world to enforce the peace.

Gameplay
The game is a fairly typical computer RPG of its era, featuring an icon-driven user interface, turn-based top-down combat and auto-mapping.

Reception
Crusaders of Khazan received polarized reviews. The game received 5 out of 5 stars in Dragon. Scorpia and Marc Klupper of Computer Gaming World in 1991 both disliked the game, however, one writing that "it could have been so much more" and the other describing it as "an almost perfect example of what happens when designers and programmers do not work together ... How could the playtesters have missed so many flaws?" In 1993 Scorpia called the game "a big disappointment".

Reviews
White Wolf #25 (Feb./March, 1991)
Joker Verlag präsentiert: Sonderheft (1992)
ASM (Aktueller Software Markt) (Dec, 1990)

References

External links

1990 video games
DOS games
Fantasy video games
FM Towns games
Flying Buffalo games
NEC PC-8801 games
NEC PC-9801 games
Role-playing video games
Sharp X1 games
X68000 games
Video games based on tabletop role-playing games
Video games developed in Japan
Video games developed in the United States
Video games featuring protagonists of selectable gender